Livio Besso Cordero (5 February 1948 – 27 April 2018) was an Italian politician who was a Senator  from 1996 to 2001.

References

1948 births
2018 deaths
People from the Province of Turin
Democrats of the Left politicians
Italian Renewal politicians
Senators of Legislature XIII of Italy
Politicians of Piedmont